is a railway station located in Kagoshima, Kagoshima, Japan.
The station opened in 1913.

Lines 
Kyushu Railway Company
Kagoshima Main Line

JR

Adjacent stations

Nearby places
Kami-Ijuin Post Office
Manjuishi

Railway stations in Kagoshima Prefecture
Railway stations in Japan opened in 1913